The Last of Mrs. Lincoln is a play by James Prideaux. It depicts the final 17 years of Mary Todd Lincoln's life that follow her husband's assassination.

It ran on Broadway from December 12, 1972 to February 4, 1973, and featured Julie Harris (as Mrs. Lincoln), George Connolly, Kate Wilkinson, Tobias Haller, David Rounds, and Leora Dana. Harris and Wilkinson reprised their roles in a 1976 television film adaptation of the play (which also featured Denver Pyle) for PBS' Hollywood Television Theatre. Harris and Dana won Tony awards for their performances in the play.

External links
ITDb page

Biographical plays
Broadway plays
Plays set in the 19th century
American plays adapted into films
Cultural depictions of Abraham Lincoln
Cultural depictions of first ladies of the United States
1972 plays
Drama Desk Award-winning plays